Natranaerobaculum is a proposed genus of bacteria, to be ranked in the family of Natranaerobiaceae.

Proposed species
There are three species proposed in the genus Natronoanaerobium, all sampled from Lake Magadi in Kenya.
 "Natronoanaerobium aggerbacterium" refers to the isolate  G-M16NWC-4. It has been referenced for establishing taxonomy of sulfate-reducing bacteria.
 "Natronoanaerobium halophilum" refers to the isolate G-M14CH-4. It has been referenced for establishing taxonomy of other samples from salt-rich environment.
 "Natronoanaerobium salstagnum" refers to the isolate O-M12SP-2. It has since been referenced in multiple publications to establish the taxonomy of uncultured isolates, including other samples from high salt environments.

See also
 List of bacterial orders
 List of bacteria genera

References 

Bacteria genera
Natranaerobiales